Carmen is a 1983 Spanish film adaptation of the novel Carmen by Prosper Mérimée, using music from the opera Carmen by Georges Bizet. It was directed and choreographed in the flamenco style by Carlos Saura and María Pagés. It is the second part of Saura's flamenco trilogy in the 1980s, preceded by Bodas de sangre and followed by El amor brujo.

The film's basic plotline is that the modern dancers re-enact in their personal lives Bizet's tragic love affair, up to its lethal climax.

Cast

Reception
The film was the highest-grossing Spanish film in the United States at the time, grossing $3.1 million. It was surpassed by Pedro Almodóvar's Women on the Verge of a Nervous Breakdown (1988). It sold 2,168,737 tickets in Germany and 871,824 in France.

Awards
The film won the BAFTA Award for Best Foreign Language Film. It was entered into the 1983 Cannes Film Festival where it won the Technical Grand Prize and the award for Best Artistic Contribution. It was nominated for the Academy Award for Best Foreign Language Film.

See also
 List of submissions to the 56th Academy Awards for Best Foreign Language Film
 List of Spanish submissions for the Academy Award for Best Foreign Language Film

References

External links
 

1983 films
1980s Spanish-language films
1983 romantic drama films
Spanish musical drama films
Spanish dance films
Films directed by Carlos Saura
1980s musical drama films
Flamenco films
Films about opera
Films based on romance novels
Films based on Carmen
Best Foreign Language Film BAFTA Award winners
Georges Bizet
1980s dance films
Films about Romani people
Spanish romantic drama films
1980s Spanish films